The men’s sprint competition in cross-country skiing at the 2022 Winter Olympics was held on 8 February, at the Kuyangshu Nordic Center and Biathlon Center in Zhangjiakou. The event was won by Johannes Høsflot Klæbo of Norway, who defended his 2018 title. The 2018 silver medalist, Federico Pellegrino, won the silver medal again. Alexander Terentyev, representing the Russian Olympic Committee, won the bronze medal. This was his first Olympic medal.

Summary
The 2018 bronze medalist Alexander Bolshunov, qualified at the Olympics, but did not start as he focused on distance events. The overall leader of the 2021–22 FIS Cross-Country World Cup before the Olympics, as well as the sprint leader, was Klæbo. He was the 2021 World Champion in individual sprint.

Qualification

Results

Qualifying
The qualifying was held at 16:45.

Quarterfinals
Quarterfinal 1

Quarterfinal 2

Quarterfinal 3

Quarterfinal 4

Quarterfinal 5

Semifinals
Semifinal 1

Semifinal 2

Final
The final was held at 20:11.

References

Men's cross-country skiing at the 2022 Winter Olympics